The Iran women's national basketball team is the women's basketball side that represents Iran in international competitions.

Tournament records

Asian Cup for Women

Asian Games

West Asian Championship for Women

References

Women's national basketball teams
Basketball